The Daytime Emmy Award for Outstanding Game Show was an award presented annually by the National Academy of Television Arts and Sciences (NATAS) and Academy of Television Arts & Sciences (ATAS). It was given in honor of a game show that features "contestants, either alone or as part of a team, who play a game involving answering questions or solving problems for money and/or prizes". Programs that have aired at least 15 original episodes for the calendar year are eligible to enter. In 2020, a category requirement has changed, lowering the number of required original episodes from fifteen to eight.

The 1st Daytime Emmy Awards ceremony was held in 1974 with the game show Password receiving the award. The award category was originally called Outstanding Game/Audience Participation Show before changing to its current title in 2013. The awards ceremony was not aired on television in 1983 and 1984, having been criticized for voting integrity. The Emmy was named after an "Immy", an affectionate term used to refer to the image orthicon camera tube. The statuette was designed by Louis McManus, who modeled the award after his wife, Dorothy. The Emmy statuette is fifteen inches tall from base to tip, weighing five pounds and is composed of iron, pewter, zinc and gold.

Since its inception, the award has been given to ten game shows. In 1980, The $20,000 Pyramid and Hollywood Squares tied for the award, which was the first tie in this category. This situation repeated later only in 2011, with Jeopardy! and Wheel of Fortune both winning the award. In 2006, Jeopardy! became the series with the most wins in the category when it won a tenth time, surpassing Pyramids  previous record of nine; Jeopardy! went on to win in six additional years, ultimately receiving seventeen wins. Jeopardy! also has been nominated on 36 occasions, more than any other series. 

In 2023, this category will be moved to the Primetime Emmy Awards as part of a re-alignment of categories between NATAS and ATAS.

Winners and nominees

1970s

1980s

1990s

2000s

2010s

2020s

Multiple wins and nominations

The following series received two or more wins in this category:

The following series received two or more nominations in this category:

NOTE: Pyramid and Password include all versions, regardless of title changes among variants of the franchise. Family Feud includes nomination for CBS one-hour version.

See also
 Daytime Emmy Award for Outstanding Game Show Host
 Daytime Emmy Award
 Primetime Emmy Award for Outstanding Game Show

References

External links
The official website of the Emmy Awards

Retired Daytime Emmy Awards
Daytime Emmy Awards
Awards established in 1974
1974 establishments in the United States